was a Japanese boxer. He competed in the men's flyweight event at the 1972 Summer Olympics. At the 1972 Summer Olympics, he defeated Rene Fortaleza of the Philippines, before losing to Douglas Rodriguez of Cuba.

References

1951 births
2007 deaths
Japanese male boxers
Olympic boxers of Japan
Boxers at the 1972 Summer Olympics
Sportspeople from Gunma Prefecture
Flyweight boxers
20th-century Japanese people